Oldtown can refer to:

Places
England
 Oldtown, Barnsley, South Yorkshire

Northern Ireland
 Oldtown, County Antrim, a townland in County Antrim

Republic of Ireland
Oldtown, Castlelost, a townland in the civil parish of Castlelost, barony of Fartullagh, County Westmeath
 Oldtown, Dublin
 Oldtown, Letterkenny

Note: There are over 30 more townlands named Oldtown in the Republic of Ireland.

United States
 Oldtown, Idaho
 Oldtown, Kentucky
 Oldtown, Maryland
 Oldtown, Ohio, an unincorporated community
 Oldtown Creek, a stream in Ohio
 Harrodsburg, Kentucky, in the United States (formerly known as Oldtown)

Other
 Oldtown (A Song of Ice and Fire), fictional city in the novel series A Song of Ice and Fire by George R. R. Martin

See also
Old Town (disambiguation)
Old City (disambiguation)